XHTML Mobile Profile (XHTML MP) is a hypertextual computer language standard designed specifically for mobile phones and other resource-constrained devices.

It is an XHTML document type defined by the Open Mobile Alliance.  XHTML-MP is derived from XHTML Basic 1.0 by adding XHTML Modules, with later versions of the standard adding more modules.  However, for certain modules, XHTML-MP does not mandate a complete implementation so an XHTML-MP browser may not be fully conforming on all modules.
The XHTML MP 1.2 DTD is the current recommendation, finalized in March 2008.

XHTML Basic 1.1 became a W3C Recommendation in July 2008, superseding XHTML-MP 1.2.

Document Type Declaration
To validate as XHTML-MP, a document must contain a proper Document Type Declaration, (DTD) or DOCTYPE, depending on the version of specification followed

<!DOCTYPE html PUBLIC "-//WAPFORUM//DTD XHTML Mobile 1.0//EN"
"http://www.wapforum.org/DTD/xhtml-mobile10.dtd">

<!DOCTYPE html PUBLIC "-//WAPFORUM//DTD XHTML Mobile 1.1//EN"
"http://www.openmobilealliance.org/tech/DTD/xhtml-mobile11.dtd">

<!DOCTYPE html PUBLIC "-//WAPFORUM//DTD XHTML Mobile 1.2//EN"
"http://www.openmobilealliance.org/tech/DTD/xhtml-mobile12.dtd">

Note that a series of revisions have been issued to correct technical errors in the above DTDs, and the DTD format is more complex and less widely supported than that of standard HTML.

MIME types 
The MIME type for XHTML Mobile Profile is "application/vnd.wap.xhtml+xml". Conforming user agents should also accept "application/xhtml+xml" and "text/html".  Many desktop browsers will only validate XHTML-MP at the display time, if an XML MIME type is specified.

References

External links 
 Open Mobile Alliance
 W3C Recommendation for XHTML 1.1
 W3C Recommendation for Modularization of XHTML as of April 10, 2001.
 XHTML-MP Authoring PracticesvteStandards

Open Mobile Alliance standards
Mobile software
XHTML
§